Melanoplus angustipennis, known generally as narrow-winged spur-throat grasshopper, is a species of spur-throated grasshopper in the family Acrididae. Other common names include the narrow-winged sand grasshopper and narrow-winged locust. It is found in North America.

References

External links

 

Melanoplinae
Articles created by Qbugbot
Insects described in 1877